"Right Down the Line" is a song written and recorded by Scottish singer-songwriter Gerry Rafferty. Released as a single in July 1978, it reached #12 on the U.S. Billboard Hot 100 and #8 on Cash Box.  It was the third release from Rafferty's City to City LP as the follow-up to his first major hit as a solo artist, "Baker Street".

"Right Down the Line" was a bigger adult contemporary hit, spending four nonconsecutive weeks at number one in the U.S.  In Canada, the song reached number five on both the pop singles and adult contemporary charts.

Personnel 
 Gerry Rafferty – voices and rhythm guitar
 Hugh Burns – lead guitar
 Tommy Eyre – organ and piano
 Gary Taylor – bass
 BJ Cole – steel guitar
 Liam Genockey – drums
 Glen Le Fleur – tambourine and clave

Chart performance

Weekly charts

Year-end charts

Cover versions

 Ron Sexsmith covered the song on a BBC Scotland tribute to Gerry Rafferty. 
 Bonnie Raitt covered the song in 2012, including it in her Slipstream album. The track reached #17 on the US Adult album alternative chart.
 Lucius covers the song on their 2018 release, Nudes.
 Sam Evian covered the song in 2019.
 Local Natives covered the song in 2021.
 Brendan Benson covered the song on his 2022 release, ''Low Key' '.
 Mills covered the song in 2022.

References

External links
 
 

1978 songs
1978 singles
United Artists Records singles
Songs written by Gerry Rafferty
Gerry Rafferty songs
Bonnie Raitt songs